Mustafa El Haddaoui, also spelled Mustapha El-Hadaoui (born 28 July 1961 in Casablanca) is a retired Moroccan professional footballer.

He spent his most of his professional career in France and was also part of the Moroccan squad at the 1986 and 1994 FIFA World Cup. He also competed for Morocco at the 1984 Summer Olympics.

International goals
Scores and results list Morocco's goal tally first.

References

External links

RC Lens profile
AS Saint-Étienne profile

1961 births
Living people
Moroccan footballers
Footballers from Casablanca
Morocco international footballers
Moroccan expatriate footballers
Footballers at the 1984 Summer Olympics
Olympic footballers of Morocco
Raja CA players
FC Lausanne-Sport players
Botola players
Ligue 1 players
AS Saint-Étienne players
Expatriate footballers in France
OGC Nice players
RC Lens players
Angers SCO players
1986 FIFA World Cup players
1994 FIFA World Cup players
1986 African Cup of Nations players
1988 African Cup of Nations players
Competitors at the 1983 Mediterranean Games
Mediterranean Games gold medalists for Morocco
Expatriate footballers in Réunion
Expatriate footballers in Switzerland
Moroccan expatriate sportspeople in France
Moroccan expatriate sportspeople in Switzerland
Association football midfielders
Mediterranean Games medalists in football